Spark is a free and open-source software web application framework and domain-specific language written in Java. It is an alternative to other Java web application frameworks such as JAX-RS, Play framework and Spring MVC. It runs on an embedded Jetty web server by default, but can be configured to run on other webservers.

Inspired by Sinatra, it does not follow the model–view–controller pattern used in other frameworks, such as Spring MVC. Instead, Spark is intended for "quickly creating web-applications in Java with minimal effort."

Spark was created and open-sourced in 2011 by Per Wendel, and was completely rewritten for version 2 in 2014. The rewrite was hugely centered on the Java 8 lambda philosophy, so Java 7 is officially not supported in version 2 and above.

Example (Hello World)
import static spark.Spark.*;

public class HelloWorld {
   public static void main(String[] args) {
      get("/hello", (request, response) -> "Hello World!");
   }
}

Supported template engines
Spark supports these template engines:
Apache Velocity
FreeMarker
Mustache
Handlebars
Jade 
Thymeleaf
Pebble
Water
jTwig 
Jinjava
Jetbrick

References

External links

Spark's GitHub repository

Free software
Java platform software
Web frameworks